Apomempsoides is a genus of longhorn beetles of the subfamily Lamiinae, containing the following species:

 Apomempsoides parva (Aurivillius, 1910)
 Apomempsoides trispinosa (Jordan, 1894)

References

Morimopsini
Cerambycidae genera